The Bright Moon Song and Dance Troupe (Chinese: 明月歌舞团; pinyin: Míngyuè Gēwǔtuán) was a group founded by Li Jinhui from the late 1920s through the 1930s.  It is also translated as Bright Moonlight Song and Dance Troupe.

Background
During the Chinese popular music boom era in the early 1930s, Shanghai had a large number of troupes, or music groups, competing for radio broadcasts and other entertainment slots.  These groups were composed mostly of sing-song girls.

Recognition
The troupe merged with Lianhua Film Company in 1931 as the first Chinese popular music group of any sort to become part of the movie industry. The company would later prove to be instrumental in the rise of the first generation of shidaiqu music.

Famous Members
 Zhou Xuan
 Wang Renmei
 Nie Er
 Bai Hong
 Li Lili
 Li Minghui
 Xu Lai
 Xue Lingxian

See also
 C-pop
 Mandopop
 Yellow Music

References

Dance companies in China
Culture in Shanghai
Musical groups from Shanghai